Evangelisch Lutheraner Dreieinigkeit Gemeinde, or Evangelical Lutheran Trinity Church is near New Leipzig, North Dakota.  It has also been known as Trinity Heupel Church and as Heupel Church. The church building was listed on the National Register of Historic Places (NRHP) in 2009

History
The church was founded by immigrants who were Germans from Russia. The NRHP listing included one contributing building and one contributing object.
It was built by Henry Bellman and others during 1902–1905 in Late Gothic Revival style.

In 1959 the church building was sold. In 1961 former members of the Trinity Lutheran Church purchased it and the land around it as a memorial landmark renaming it "Trinity Heupel Church". The church is now used for weddings, funerals, and an annual potluck meal.

References

External links
The Citizens of New Leipzig, ND

German-Russian culture in North Dakota
Churches on the National Register of Historic Places in North Dakota
Carpenter Gothic church buildings in North Dakota
Churches completed in 1905
National Register of Historic Places in Grant County, North Dakota
1905 establishments in North Dakota
Lutheran churches in North Dakota